Hanns Braun (26 October 1886 – 9 October 1918) was a German athlete.

Biography
He was born in Wernfels (today Spalt) and died near Saint-Quentin, Aisne, France as fighter-pilot in an airplane-crash in World War I.

He won the bronze medal in the men's 800 metres race at the 1908 Summer Olympics in London with a time of 1:55.2, which was .8 seconds faster than the previous Olympic record but 3 seconds slower than the time of Mel Sheppard, the winner of the race. His semifinal time had been 1:58.0.

Braun was also a member of the silver medal German medley relay team. He ran the final 800 metres of the 1600 metre race, following Arthur Hoffmann, Hans Eicke, and Otto Trieloff. The team had an easy time defeating the Dutch squad in the first round, finishing in a time of 3:43.2. The final was a more difficult race, however, and the Germans never had a chance of catching the Americans. The first three runners found themselves in third place, and Braun began his leg five yards behind the Hungarian runner. He was able to catch up and pass Ödön Bodor, however, giving the Germans a second-place victory of a tenth of a second at 3:32.4.

Braun also ran in the 1500 metres. He placed third in his first round (semifinal) heat with a time of 4:18.2 and did not advance to the final.

See also
 List of Olympians killed in World War I

References

Notes
 
 
 

1886 births
1918 deaths
German male middle-distance runners
Olympic athletes of Germany
Athletes (track and field) at the 1908 Summer Olympics
Athletes (track and field) at the 1912 Summer Olympics
Olympic silver medalists for Germany
Olympic bronze medalists for Germany
German military personnel killed in World War I
People from Roth (district)
Sportspeople from Middle Franconia
People from the Kingdom of Bavaria
Military personnel of Bavaria
German World War I pilots
Aviators killed in aviation accidents or incidents in France
Luftstreitkräfte personnel
Medalists at the 1912 Summer Olympics
Medalists at the 1908 Summer Olympics
Olympic silver medalists in athletics (track and field)
Olympic bronze medalists in athletics (track and field)
Victims of aviation accidents or incidents in 1918